Anne Packard (born 1933) is an American artist best known for atmospheric seascape paintings.

Biography
 
Packard was born in 1933 in Hyde Park, New York. While growing up in Hyde Park, she spent her childhood summers in Provincetown, Massachusetts.

She comes from a family of artists, including her grandmother, Zella, and grandfather, Max Bohm, a 19th- and 20th-century romantic impressionist who was one of the founding members of an artist colony in Provincetown.  She studied at Bard College in New York, and moved to Provincetown in 1977, where she apprenticed under Philip Malicoat.

Her daughters Cynthia Packard and Leslie Packard are also notable painters. Her son, Michael Packard, is the only person in recorded history to have been inside a whale's mouth and survive; he was freed as the whale dislodged him from its mouth.

Anne Packard opened the doors to Packard Gallery in 1988. The heritage building is located in the historic Gallery District in Provincetown and was once home to a Christian Science Church. Packard Gallery represents the works of Anne Packard and Leslie Packard, two generations of widely exhibited and collected painters. Anne, a renowned landscape artist, paints simple, sparsely-rendered scenes of the Outer Cape and Europe. Leslie paints still-lifes speaking with the simplicity of pure color and elegant form.

References

External links
A portrait of Anne Packard, a short video on YouTube.
Packard Gallery

1933 births
21st-century American painters
American women painters
20th-century American painters
Provincetown, Massachusetts
Living people
20th-century American women artists
21st-century American women artists